Remi Francis Wolf (born February 2, 1996) is an American singer and songwriter from California. As a senior at Palo Alto High School, she appeared as a contestant on American Idol in 2014. After completing her studies at USC Thornton School of Music in 2018, she made her solo debut with the self-released extended play You're A Dog! in October 2019. Wolf subsequently released her second EP and major-label debut, I'm Allergic To Dogs!, on Island Records and Virgin EMI Records in June 2020, followed by her debut studio album, Juno, in October 2021.

Early life and education
Wolf was born in Palo Alto, California on February 2, 1996, to a Sicilian mother and a Russian-Persian father. At around the age of eight she became interested in competitive skiing, and represented the US in alpine skiing at the Youth Olympic Games for two consecutive years. When she was 14, she formed her first band with a friend called Remi and Chloe (later, Remi, Chloe, & The Extracts). As a senior in high school, Wolf appeared as a contestant during the audition rounds on the thirteenth season of American Idol in 2014, but without any formal dismissal, did not reappear later on in the show. At age 17, she moved to Los Angeles, where she attended the USC Thornton School of Music, graduating in 2018.

Career 

Wolf met producer Jared Solomon (also known as Solomonophonic) while in college and began collaborating with him thereafter. Her first single, "Guy," was produced by Solomon and was released in 2019. Off the success of that song, Wolf opened for Still Woozy on his tour in April of that year. She also toured with Cautious Clay and performed at both the Los Angeles Times Festival of Books and Viva Pomona! later in 2019. She released her first EP, You're a Dog!, in September 2019. She was later signed to Island Records, a division of the Universal Music Group. 

Her first single as an Island signee, "Woo!", was released in April 2020. That was followed by the singles "Photo ID" and "Disco Man". Those tracks would go on to appear on Wolf's second EP, I'm Allergic to Dogs, released in June 2020 via Island. "Photo ID" accrued numerous streams and shares on TikTok throughout 2020. In November 2020, her single, "Hello Hello Hello" was featured in an ad for the iPhone 12. In May 2021, she released, We Love Dogs!, a remix EP with guest appearances from acts like Sylvan Esso, Beck, Dominic Fike, Hot Chip, and others.

Later in 2021, Wolf began releasing new singles, including "Liquor Store," "Grumpy Old Man," and "Quiet on Set." These would appear on her major label debut studio album, Juno, released via Island in October 2021. In March 2022, she released the single, "Pool," with Still Woozy. Later that year, Wolf opened for Lorde on the North American leg of her "Solar Power" tour. In June 2022, Wolf released a "deluxe" version of Juno with 4 additional tracks. That month, she toured throughout Europe, including a stop at the Firenze Rocks festival in Florence, Italy where she performed with the Red Hot Chili Peppers and Nas. Those dates constituted the first leg of Wolf's "GWINGLE GWONGLE" tour, which had stops across North America later in the fall of 2022. In August 2022 in collaboration with Spotify, Wolf released the Live at Electric Lady EP, a collection of six live songs, including a cover of Frank Ocean's "Pink + White." In November 2022, Wolf announced her first tour of Australia and New Zealand during which she is scheduled to play multiple festivals and a handful of headlining shows in December 2022 and January 2023. In January of 2023, Wolf announced that she will be performing at Coachella.

Artistry 
Musically, Wolf performs in what she describes as a "funky soul pop" genre. In a 2021 interview, she stated she wants to "constantly try to innovate the sound of pop music" and "erase the rules of pop". The New York Times wrote that she turns the genre bedroom pop into "hypercolored explosions". She cites Still Woozy, SZA, and John Mayer as musical influences.

Personal life 
Wolf is bisexual. She has been based in Los Angeles, California, since circa 2014. In June 2020, she was checked into rehab for alcoholism issues. She claims to have been sober ever since, and that in past instances she frequently drank to the point of blacking out; although she could easily function in daily life, she had started fighting with family, friends and collaborators.

Discography

Studio albums

Extended plays

Live collections

Singles

As lead artist

As featured artist

Songwriting credits

References 

1996 births
Living people
Musicians from Palo Alto, California
21st-century American women singers
American women pop singers
American women singer-songwriters
American women in electronic music
American funk singers
Bedroom pop musicians
Island Records artists
Palo Alto High School alumni
USC Thornton School of Music alumni
American Idol participants
Bisexual musicians
LGBT people from the San Francisco Bay Area
American LGBT singers
21st-century American singers
Singer-songwriters from California
Bisexual women